Marguerite Roesgen-Champion (24 January 1894 – 30 June 1976) was a Swiss composer, pianist and harpsichordist.

Roesgen-Champion studied at the Conservatoire de Musique de Genève, notably with Marie Panthès. From 1926, she lived as a composer in Paris. She composed works for orchestra, harpsichord and piano, as well as chamber and choral works.

As a pianist she performed several piano concertos by Mozart and Haydn.  On harpsichord she performed compositions for harpsichord by Jean-Henry d'Anglebert and Johann Christoph Friedrich Bach.

In 1940 Roesgen-Champion founded a concert series entitled Suites Française which was used a showcase for students of distinction from the Paris Conservatory.  She also supported the Orchestre Jane Evrard (also known as the Orchestre féminin de Paris), founded by Jane Evrard, which was an all-female chamber orchestra that performed contemporary works including the premiere of Guy Ropartz' Petite Suite.

Works
 Sonata for Flute and Keyboard
 Blue and Gold Story, piano with 4 hands
 French Suite for flute and harp
 Domine not in Furore for mixed choir a cappella
 Valses for piano
 Concert for saxophone, harpsichord and bassoon
 At the Moon, singing flute and piano
 Concerto grosso for violin, cello, harpsichord and orchestra

References

External links
 

1894 births
1976 deaths
Swiss classical pianists
Swiss women composers
Swiss women pianists
Musicians from Geneva
20th-century classical pianists
Women classical pianists
Swiss harpsichordists
Women harpsichordists
20th-century women composers
20th-century Swiss composers
20th-century women pianists